Süseler See is a lake at Süsel, Kreis Ostholstein, Schleswig-Holstein, Germany. At an elevation of 24 m, its surface area is 0.77 km².

Lakes of Schleswig-Holstein
LSuselerSee